Pellenes vanharteni is a species of jumping spiders in Cape Verde. They are found in the island of Sal.

Etymology
The species is named after entomologist Antonius van Harten, who collected the type.

Description
The male spider measures around 1.3 mm long by 1.1 mm and the abdomen is 1.2 mm by 0.9 mm.

References

Salticidae
Spiders of Africa
Spiders described in 1998
Taxa named by Wanda Wesołowska
Arthropods of Cape Verde
Endemic fauna of Cape Verde
Fauna of Sal, Cape Verde